Mark Chung (born 3 June 1957, in Leeds, England) is a German musician and music publisher, probably best known for his work as  the bass guitarist of the German band Einstürzende Neubauten.

Biography
From 1980 Chung was a member of the West German post-punk band Abwärts from Hamburg. He joined Einstürzende Neubauten in 1981. He assumed responsibility for business management of the band until leaving in 1994 to concentrate on his work in the music industry.

He formed Freibank Music Publishing in 1986, initially for controlling and administering the copyrights of Einstürzende Neubauten, but Freibank also offered this service to other musicians and steadily grew.
In 1996, Chung moved to London, where he became senior vice-president of Sony Music International. After 9 years with Sony Music, he moved back to Germany and now directs the Freibank office in Berlin. In 2006, Chung was elected chairman of the German association of independent music companies (Verband unabhängiger Musikunternehmen - VUT) and he also sits on the board of the public-private partnership Initiative Musik.

He is married and has two sons and a daughter.

References

External links
Freibank Music Publishing - official web site
 

1957 births
Living people
German bass guitarists
Male bass guitarists
Einstürzende Neubauten members
Musicians from Hamburg
Businesspeople from Berlin
German male guitarists